Michel Houel (8 November 1942 – 30 November 2016) was a French politician. He was the mayor of Crécy-la-Chapelle from 2001 until 2015, and represented the Seine-et-Marne department in the Senate of France from 2004 until his death in 2016. He was a member of the Union for a Popular Movement Party.

References

Page on the Senate website

1942 births
2016 deaths
French Senators of the Fifth Republic
Union for a Popular Movement politicians
Senators of Seine-et-Marne
Mayors of places in Île-de-France
Politicians from Île-de-France